TreeHouse School is a non-maintained special school and sixth form for children aged 4 to 19 that are diagnosed with autism. The school is located in the London Borough of Haringey, England, and is operated by the charity Ambitious about Autism. Children from 17 local authority areas attend the school.

Founded in 1997, by a group of parents including writer Nick Hornby, it was instituted to educate children using Applied Behavior Analysis outside of a home schooling context, and was originally based in a room at Swiss Cottage Library. It is currently located in Muswell Hill, where roughly 90 pupils attend. The school enrols pupils that have a diagnosis of autism or a related communication disorder, and have a Statement of Special Educational Needs.

The school has links with local mainstream schools, and some pupils take part in a range of classes at these schools including subjects such as music or sports. TreeHouse School also runs a programme of 'Reverse Inclusion', where children from Muswell Hill Primary School visit TreeHouse once a week to learn and play with children at the primary department of the school.

The school was rated as 'Outstanding' by Ofsted in 2012. The school is also accredited by the National Autistic Society.

References

External links
 TreeHouse School official website

1997 establishments in England
Autism-related organisations in the United Kingdom
Educational institutions established in 1997
Private co-educational schools in London
Private schools in the London Borough of Haringey
Muswell Hill
Special schools in the London Borough of Haringey